Johnny Harris (born 28 May 1988) is an American filmmaker, journalist, and YouTuber, currently based in Washington, D.C. Harris produced and hosted the Borders series for American news and opinion website Vox. He also created three videos for The New York Times. Harris launched the company Bright Trip in 2019, which offers video-based travel courses.

Early life and education
Harris was raised in a Mormon family, living in a small town in Oregon. He graduated from Ashland High School, in Ashland, Oregon. He served a two-year mission for the Church of Jesus Christ of Latter-day Saints in Tijuana, Mexico, but has since left the church.

Harris holds a Bachelor of Arts in International Relations and Affairs from Brigham Young University (2013) and an Master of Arts in international peace and conflict resolution from American University (2016).

Career

Borders
From 2017 to 2019, Harris produced and hosted Borders, a documentary short film series on Vox that profiled sociopolitical issues in various border regions worldwide. It was twice nominated for an Emmy Award. The series was cancelled in 2020 due to the COVID-19 pandemic and the George Floyd protests.

YouTube
Harris's YouTube channel was set up in June 2011. Since the cancellation of Borders, Harris has continued to produce videos on international affairs, history, and geography with creative visual graphics, which he has published on his own channel. He also produced videos with The New York Times.  Harris has 3.75 million YouTube subscribers. Some of his notable videos tackle topics such as wars, foreign relations, and history of colonization in the United States, the Middle East, and the Pacific islands.

Freelance 
On November 9, 2021, Harris was credited as video producer on an opinion piece published to The New York Times, titled "Blue States, You're the Problem". It later won an Emmy Award.

Borders series

Personal life
Harris is married to Isabel "Izzy" Harris, with whom he has two sons, Oliver and Henry.

Harris is diagnosed with dyslexia and attention deficit hyperactivity disorder.

His father-in-law is the captain of a Ballistic missile submarine (SSBN).

References

External links
 

American male journalists
Living people
Brigham Young University alumni
American University alumni
People from Ashland, Oregon
1988 births
Former Latter Day Saints
Latter Day Saints from Oregon
21st-century American journalists